Emerson is an unincorporated community in northwest Marion County, in the U.S. state of Missouri. The community is located on Missouri Route M approximately ten miles northwest of Palmyra, on a ridge north of the South Fabius River.  There are no businesses there, or services excepting two churches and a river access ramp; but there are numerous homes.

The community was originally named Houston for Sam Houston when established in 1837 and had a post office in 1853. The name was changed to Emerson sometime between 1858 and 1861 for one John Emerson who was an original settler in the area. It had a post office as Emerson from 1867 to 1904.

References

Unincorporated communities in Marion County, Missouri
Unincorporated communities in Missouri